Lecanodiaspis acaciae is a species of scale insect of the family Lecanodiaspididae. The species was described by Maskell in 1893.

References

Hemiptera of Australia
Lecanodiaspididae